Bas-Caraquet  is an unincorporated community in Gloucester County, New Brunswick, Canada. It held village status prior to 2023.

History

On 1 January 2023, Bas-Caraquet amalgamated with the town of Caraquet. Bas-Caraquet remains in official use.

Geography 
Situated on the Acadian Peninsula on the shore of Chaleur Bay, its name translates into "Lower Caraquet".  It is located at the eastern entrance to Caraquet Harbour, adjacent to the town of Caraquet.

Demographics 

Economy 
Fishing is the village's principal industry.

Notable people

See also
List of communities in New Brunswick

References

External links
 Village de Bas Caraquet

Communities in Gloucester County, New Brunswick
Former villages in New Brunswick